Neuwerk may refer to:

 Neuwerk, a tidal island in the Wadden Sea on the German North Sea coast
 Great Tower Neuwerk or new work, a watchtower built 1310 on the island Neuwerk
 Neuwerk, a quarter of Hamburg, Germany containing the island Neuwerk
 Neuwerk, a quarter of Oberharz am Brocken, Germany
 Neuwerk, a former quarter of Mönchengladbach, Germany
 Neuwerk-Mitte, a quarter of the borough Mönchengladbach-East
 Neuwerker Donk or Neuwerk-Donk, a village in the quarter Bettrath-Hoven, Mönchengladbach, Germany
 Neuwerk convent, a monastery in Mönchengladbach
 Neuwerk, a monastery at Halle, Germany
 Neuwerk, a German ship
 Neuwerk Church, a church in Erfurt, Germany
 Neuwerk Church, a church in Goslar, Germany
 Neuwerk, a Christian youth movement (1919–1935) in Germany
 Das Neue Werk or Der Christliche Demokrat, a Christian weekly German newspaper (until 1935)
 Neuwerk garden or Gottorf Castle, a castle in Schleswig, Germany
 Bocșa, a town in southwestern Romania